William Frederick James Harvey DFC & Bar MC MBE (8 January 1897 – 21 July 1972) was a British flying ace in World War I credited with twenty-six victories.  He was the first recipient of the DFC & Bar and was also awarded the MC.

Involvement in World War I
Harvey served with the Signal Company of the Royal Engineers until he transferred to the RFC in December 1916.  In December 1917 he was posted as a pilot to No. 22 Squadron flying Bristol F.2B fighters. His first air victory, a downed Pfalz D.III, was recorded 16 March 1918, followed by an Albatros D.V two days later.

With three more kills in March Harvey established himself as a flying ace. In May 1918 he was promoted to captain and commanded 'B' Flight. In the last decade of May Harvey, flying with Lt. George Thomson as his flight observer, downed two observation balloons and four German airplanes; on 20 June he downed three enemy airplanes. Shortly after this success Thomson was replaced with Captain Dennis Waight, who remained Harvey's teammate until the end of campaign. The crew scored 9 kills during the Battle of Amiens in August 1918.

Of his twenty-six victories (comprising 3 balloons, 12 and 2 shared destroyed, and 9 'out of control') credited to Harvey, eighteen were achieved utilising his front gun.

Later military service
After the war, Harvey served as an instructor with 33 TD Squadron of the Army of the Rhine.  On leaving the RAF he became a farmer.  During the Second World War he was awarded the MBE for his service.  When the war ended he retired to Kent, writing many aviation-related articles and the history of his old RAF Squadron, No. 22, entitled 'Pi in the Sky'.

Harvey married Mary Gurdon, sister of his squadron mate John Everard Gurdon, in 1920.

Honours and awards
 3 August 1918 - Distinguished Flying Cross - Lt. William Frederick James Harvey:

"As a fighting pilot this officer has the real offensive spirit regardless of personal danger. He has destroyed several enemy machines whilst fighting against superior numbers."

 3 December 1918 - Bar to the Distinguished Flying Cross - Lieut. (A./Capt.) William Frederick James Harvey, D.F.C. (FRANCE.)

"A brilliant fighting pilot, who has proved himself a capable leader in many offensive patrols. During the August operations he personally accounted for seven enemy machines and, in company with another pilot, destroyed an eighth, displaying courage and tenacity of high order."

 10 April 1945 - Member of the Order of the British Empire - Captain (temporary Major) William Frederick James Harvey, D.F.C. (73684), Royal Artillery, Territorial Army.

Notes

References
 . The book is dedicated personally to Harvey "and all the other Biff Boys"
 

1897 births
1972 deaths
British World War I flying aces
Royal Corps of Signals officers
Royal Flying Corps officers
British Army personnel of World War I
Recipients of the Military Cross
Members of the Order of the British Empire
Recipients of the Distinguished Flying Cross (United Kingdom)
People from Wingham, Kent